Agenore Incrocci (4 July 1919 – 15 November 2005), best known as Age, was an Italian screenwriter, considered one of the fathers of the commedia all'italiana as one of the two members of the duo Age & Scarpelli, together with Furio Scarpelli.

Biography
Incrocci was born in Brescia, into a family including several actors, such as his sister Zoe, and spent his youth moving with them to numerous places of Italy. His first work in the cinema world was a dubber for Mario Monicelli's first movie, I ragazzi della Via Paal (1935). Subsequently, he worked for a radio, and in the meantime he started writing comic scripts. He also studied law, but without graduating.

He spent the first four years of World War II in France, as a prisoner of the French Army first and, later, of the Wehrmacht. He managed to escape, however, and fought for a year with the United States Army. Back from the front, he worked again in the radio and for wrote for theatre and humour magazine.

In wrote his first screenplay for I due orfanelli, directed by Mario Mattoli. In 1949 started his famous collaboration with Furio Scarpelli, as the duo Age & Scarpelli.

Together with Scarpelli, he worked on a total of 120 Italian movies. These include some of the most famous of all, such as Sergio Leone's The Good, the Bad and the Ugly, Mario Monicelli's I soliti ignoti and many Totò movies. He also worked on some scripts on his own, such as that of Pietro Germi's Divorzio all'italiana.

As an actor, he took part to La terrazza by Ettore Scola (screenplay by Age & Scarpelli, of course) and Ecce Bombo by Nanni Moretti.

He died in Rome in 2005.

See also

External links

Incrocci's death

1919 births
2005 deaths
20th-century Italian male writers
20th-century Italian screenwriters
David di Donatello winners
Italian male screenwriters
People from Brescia
Italian prisoners of war in World War II
World War II prisoners of war held by France
World War II prisoners of war held by Germany
United States Army personnel of World War II
Italian escapees
Escapees from German detention
Cannes Film Festival Award for Best Screenplay winners